The Hanriot HD.14 was a military trainer aircraft produced in large numbers in France during the 1920s. It was a conventional, two-bay biplane with unstaggered wings of equal span. The pilot and instructor sat in tandem, open cockpits, and the fuselage was braced to the lower wing with short struts. The main units of the fixed tailskid undercarriage were divided, each unit carrying two wheels, and early production examples also had anti-noseover skids projecting forwards as well.

In 1922, production shifted to a much improved version, known as the HD.14ter or HD.14/23. This featured a smaller wing area, and revised tail fin, interplane and cabane struts, and fuselage cross-section. The landing gear track was narrowed in order to facilitate the aircraft's loading onto the standard army trailer of the day.

Incredibly prolific (the Aéronautique Militaire alone operated 1,925 examples), it was also licence-produced by Mitsubishi in Japan, where another 145 were built, and by the CWL and Samolot in Poland, where respectively 125 and 120 were built (designated locally as H.28).

Variants
 HD.14 - Original production version. Also known as the HD.14 EP2.
 HD.14ter - Improved version of 1922. Also known as the HD.14/23.
 HD.14S (Sanitaire) - Air ambulance version
 HD.141 - Remanufactured ex-Army HD.14s for French aeroclub use
 H.410 - A 1928 development with Lorraine 5-cyl radial and revised undercarriage.
 H.411 - development of the HD.410
 LH.412 - development of the HD.410
 H.28 - Polish designation of license-produced slightly modified HD.14/23 
 己 1 (Ka-1) - Japanese Army designation of the Hanriot HD.14 built under licence by Mitsubishi

Operators

 
 Belgian Air Force
 
 Aéronautique Militaire''
 
 Imperial Japanese Army Air Force (145, licence-built by Mitsubishi)
 
 Estonian Air Force (2)
 
 Polish Air Force (295, including 245 licence-built H-28)
 
 Royal Romanian Air Force (15)
 
 Soviet Air Force (30)
 
 Bulgarian Air Force

Specifications (HD.14, early production)

See also

References

Bibliography

External links

Aviafrance

Hanriot aircraft
1920s French military trainer aircraft
Single-engined tractor aircraft
Biplanes
Aircraft first flown in 1920
Rotary-engined aircraft